Earth Mama is a 2023 drama film directed and written by Savanah Leaf, based on the short film, The Heart Still Hums by Leaf and Taylor Russell.

Cast
 Tia Nomore as Gia
 Erika Alexander as Miss Carmen
 Doechii as Trina
 Sharon Duncan-Brewster as Monica
 Dominic Fike as Miles
 Bokeem Woodbine as Paul

References

External links 

2023 drama films

2023 directorial debut films
2023 independent films
African-American drama films
Features based on short films
Films set in Oakland, California
Social realism in film